Gloppedalsura, or Gloppura, is a scree in Gloppedalen, Rogaland, Norway, in the Gjesdal and Bjerkreim municipalities. It is one of the largest screes in Scandinavia and Northern Europe.

World War 2
During the invasion of Norway, 250 Norwegian soldiers used the scree as a natural fortress and held back two 
German battalions. One Norwegian soldier lost his life in the battle. Losses on the German side are uncertain and varies between 12 and 44 soldiers.

References

Rocks
Landforms of Rogaland
Gjesdal
Bjerkreim